USS Shabonee may refer to:

 was an English-built tugboat acquired by the U.S. Navy in 1943.
 was a tugboat acquired by the U.S. Navy in 1974.

United States Navy ship names